Black Holes and Baby Universes and other Essays is a 1993 popular science book by English physicist Stephen Hawking.

Overview
This book is a collection of essays and lectures written by Hawking, mainly about the makeup of black holes, and why they might be nodes from which other universes grow. Hawking discusses black hole thermodynamics, special relativity, general relativity, and quantum mechanics. Hawking also describes his life when he was young, and his later experience of motor neurone disease. The book also includes an interview with Professor Hawking.

References

1993 non-fiction books
Books by Stephen Hawking
Bantam Books books
Physics education in the United Kingdom

he:סטיבן הוקינג#מספריו אשר תורגמו לעברית